Brent Graeme Miller (born October 28, 1974) is a Canadian voice, film and television actor who works for Ocean Studios and various other studios in Vancouver, British Columbia, Canada. He has played several roles in anime, most notably Sting Oakley in Mobile Suit Gundam SEED Destiny and Hot Shot in Transformers: Armada and Transformers: Energon. Miller is best known for his role as Zane in Lego Ninjago: Masters of Spinjitzu. He has a YouTube Channel which focuses on Ninjago and voice acting.

Personal life
Brent Miller is married to Nicole Bouma and together they have two daughters named Chelsea Miller and Jaeda Lily Miller.

Filmography

Film

Television

Video games

Staff credits

References

External links
 Official website
 

Living people
Canadian casting directors
Canadian male television actors
Canadian male video game actors
Canadian male voice actors
Male actors from Vancouver
Canadian voice directors
1974 births